The Veitch Memorial Trophy is the Junior ice hockey Grand Championship of Newfoundland and Labrador.  The trophy is awarded by Hockey Newfoundland and Labrador.

History
The trophy is named after Cyril Veitch a former executive of the Newfoundland Amateur Hockey Association.

In the mid-1970s, Junior hockey in Newfoundland was granted Junior A classification.  The winner of the Veitch Memorial Trophy was granted the right to represent Newfoundland in the Centennial Cup playdowns.  Since the early 1980s, the winner of the Veitch Memorial Trophy is granted the right to play in the Don Johnson Cup to determine the Atlantic Junior B champion.

Leagues currently in competition
St. John's Junior Hockey League (SJJHL)

Former leagues
Newfoundland Junior A Hockey League (NJAHL)
Central Beothuk Junior Hockey League (CBJHL)
Central-West Junior Hockey League (CWJHL)

Champions
National Junior B Level
1953 - Grand Falls
1954 - Grand Falls
1955 - Bell Island
1956 - St. John's
1957 - Grand Falls
1958 - St. John's
1959 - St. John's
1960 - Grand Falls Jays defeated St. John's Jr. Capitals 2-games-to-none
1961 - St. John's
1962 - Grand Falls
1963 - St. John's
1964 - No Competition
1965 - St. John's
1966 - Corner Brook
1967 - No Competition
1968 - No Competition	
1969 - Grand Falls
1970 - St. John's Jr. Capitals
1971 - St. John's Jr. Capitals defeated Corner Brook Jr. Royals 2-games-to-1

National Junior A Level - Winner moves on to Centennial Cup
1972 - St. John's Jr. Capitals defeated Gander Jr. Flyers 2-games-to-1
1973 - Buchans Miners defeated Gander Jr. Flyers 4-games-to-3
1974 - Gander Jr. Flyers defeated Bay St. George Huskies 4-games-to-1
1975 - Gander Jr. Flyers defeated Clarenville Caribous 4-games-to-none
1976 - No Competition
1977 - Corner Brook Jr. Royals defeated St. John's Jr. Capitals 2-games-to-1

National Junior B Level
1978 - No Competition
1979 - Grand Falls
1980 - St. John's Blue Caps defeated Corner Brook Jr. Royals
1981 - Gander Jr. Flyers

Winner moves on to Don Johnson Cup
1982 - St. John's Celtics
1983 - Gander Jr. Flyers defeated St. John's Jr. Shamrocks 4-3 (Tournament Play)
1984 - St. John's Jr. 50's defeated St. John's Jr. Shamrocks 6-5 (Tournament Play)
1985 - St. John's Junior 50's
1986 - Mount Pearl Blades
1987 - St. John's Jr. 50's defeated Clarenville Caribous 7-6 (Tournament Play)
1988-94 - No Competition
1995 - St. John's Celtics
1996 - Deer Lake Video Juniors
1997 - Bell Island Junior Blues
1998 - Bell Island Junior Blues
1999 - No Competition
2000 - Conception Bay North Jr. Stars defeated St. John's Jr. Celtics 5-1 (Tournament Play)
2001 - St. John's Jr. Celtics defeated Avalon Jr. Capitals 4-3 (Tournament Play)
2002 - St. John's Jr. Capitals defeated Labrador West Black Bears 2-games-to-none
2003 - St. John's Jr. Celtics defeated Trinity-Placentia Flyers 6-1 (Tournament Play)
2004 - No Competition
2005 - Trinity-Placentia Flyers defeated Central Jr. Arctic Blast 6-1 (Tournament Play)
2006 - Conception Bay North Jr. Stars defeated Central Jr. Arctic Blast 2-games-to-1
2007 - Bell Island Jr. Blues defeated Mount Pearl Jr. Blades 2-1 (Tournament Play)
2008 - St. John's Jr. Celtics defeated Bell Island Jr. Blues 3-2 2OT (Tournament Play)
2009 - St. John's Jr. Caps defeated Central Jr. Cataracts 7-4 (Tournament Play)
2010 - St. John's Jr. Caps defeated Central Jr. Cataracts 2-games-to-none
2011 - St. John's Jr. Celtics defeated Central Jr. Cataracts 2-1 (Tournament Play)
2012 - St. John's Jr. Caps defeated Mount Pearl Jr. Blades 4-3 OT (Tournament Play)
2013 - St. John's Jr. Caps defeated Stephenville Jr. Jets 15-2 (Tournament Play)
2014 - No Competition
2015 - No Competition
2016 - No Competition

External links
Newfoundland Hockey Hall of Fame

Canadian ice hockey trophies and awards
Ice hockey in Newfoundland and Labrador
Newfoundland and Labrador awards